Knowledge Is King is the third solo studio album by American rapper Kool Moe Dee, released on May 30, 1989, via Jive Records.

Background
The album was recorded at Soundtrack Studios in New York City, New York. Production for the album was handled by Teddy Riley, LaVaba Mallison, Pete Q. Harris, and Kool Moe Dee himself. The record peaked at number 25 on the Billboard 200 and number 2 on the Top R&B/Hip-Hop Albums. It is his second best-selling album, achieving gold certification by the RIAA on August 22, 1989 (his previous album How Ya Like Me Now was certified platinum).

The album spawned four charted singles: "Let's Go", "All Night Long", "I Go to Work", and "They Want Money". "They Want Money" went the most successful single of the effort, peaking at #3 on the Hot R&B/Hip-Hop Songs, #2 on the Hot Rap Songs and #91 on the UK Singles Chart. "I Go to Work" peaked at #13 on the Hot R&B/Hip-Hop Songs and #5 on the Hot Rap Songs. "All Night Long" peaked at #70 on the Hot R&B/Hip-Hop Songs, and "Let's Go", a diss track towards Kool Moe Dee's foe LL Cool J, peaked at #11 on the Hot R&B/Hip-Hop Songs.

Track listing

Notes
Track 11 is a hidden diss track towards LL Cool J. 
Sample credits
"They Want Money" contains elements from "Get on the Good Foot" by James Brown and "It's Just Begun" by Jimmy Castor
"The Avenue" contains elements from "White Lines (Don't Don't Do It)" by Grandmaster Melle Mel and "Down on the Avenue" by Fat Larry's Band
"I Go to Work" contains elements from "Super Bad" by James Brown and "Think (About It)" by Lyn Collins
"All Night Long" contains elements from "Groove Me" by King Floyd
"Knowledge is King" contains elements from "Funky Drummer" by James Brown and "I Get Lifted" by KC & the Sunshine Band
"I'm Hittin' Hard" contains elements from "Brother Green (The Disco King)" by Roy Ayers and "The Wildstyle" by Time Zone
"Get the Picture" contains elements from "Gotta Be Funky" by Monk Higgins & The Specialties
"I'm Blowin' Up" contains elements from "UFO" by ESG and "Funky Drummer" by James Brown
"The Don" contains elements from "Gimme Some More" by The J.B.'s, "The Mexican" by Babe Ruth, "It's Just Begun" by Jimmy Castor and "Gangster Boogie" by Chicago Gangsters
"Pump Your Fist" contains elements from "Soul Makossa" by Manu Dibango
"Let's Go" contains elements from "Think (About It)" by Lyn Collins, "Thriller" by Michael Jackson, "Jack the Ripper" and "I Can't Live Without My Radio" by LL Cool J

Personnel
Mohandes Dewese - vocals, producer
LaVaba Mallison - mixing, producer
Edward Theodore Riley - producer
Peter Brian Harris - producer
Chris Trevett - engineering
Josh Chervokas - engineering 
George Karras - mixing
Kafi Tuda - grooming
Pietro Alfieri - artwork
Doug Rowell - photography
Ralph Wernli - photography

Charts

Weekly charts

Year-end charts

Singles

Certifications

References

External links 

1989 albums
Jive Records albums
Kool Moe Dee albums
Albums produced by Teddy Riley